I Learned is the second studio album from Hong Kong singer-songwriter Jinny Ng, released on 26 June 2013. "I Learned", "Smoke", and "Meaningless Love" were released as singles from the album, and the album also included "Rescue Me" featuring Hubert Wu and a cover of "Confession" by Sandy Lamb.

Tracklisting

Music Videos

Critical reception 

It received generally positive feedback. A commentator from Douban Music praised the songwriting of the songs but criticized the arrangement. The commentator also criticized the lack of distinct catchy melodies as they are generally in the same style, though "Rescue Me" was considered the highlight of the album for its catchy melody. As for the cover, Ng was described as not performing well compared to Shirley Kwan. The label was also blamed as the album was too market-oriented and stifling the artist's talent. Many others praised "Smoke" for its melody and lyrics.

Chart performance

Singles

Awards

I Learned 
 Jade Solid Gold Songs Selection – Winning Song
 2013 Metro Showbiz Hit Awards – Hit Karaoke Song
 2013 IFPI Hong Kong Sales Awards – Top 10 Digital Songs

I Understand 
 2013 Metro Radio Mandarin Music Awards – Best Original Songs
 2013 TVB8 Mandarin Music on Demand Awards Presentation – Top 10 Songs

Rescue Me 
 2013 Metro Showbiz Hit Awards – Best Collaboration

References 

2013 albums
Jinny Ng albums